Edward "Junior" Hanley (born September 9, 1944) is a Canadian stock car driver and race car builder. Born in Nova Scotia Canada, he migrated to Ontario in the early-1970s at the suggestion of his Friend/Rival Don Biederman

He has built race cars for drivers such as Dick Trickle and Darrell Waltrip.

He was inducted into the Canadian Motorsport Hall of Fame in 2000, and the Maritime Motorsports Hall of Fame in 2011.

References

External links
 

Racing drivers from Nova Scotia
Living people
1944 births
American Speed Association drivers